Down And Dirty Live is a Danger Danger live EP. It contains five songs recorded live in 1989 during presentations at Bangles at Denver, Colorado and L'Amour at Brooklyn, New York.

Track listing
 "Boys Will Be Boys" - 6:12 (Bruno Ravel/Steve West)
 "Bang Bang" - 4:49 (Ravel/West)
 "Groove or Die" [Instrumental] - 5:56 (Andy Timmons)
 "Naughty Naughty" - 6:30 (Ravel/West)
 "Rock 'N' Roll Hoochie Koo" (Johnny Winter + Rick Derringer cover) - 4:15 (Derringer)

Personnel
Ted Poley - vocals
Andy Timmons - guitar
Bruno Ravel - bass guitar
Kasey Smith - keyboard
Steve West - drums

References

Danger Danger albums
1990 debut EPs
Live EPs